Bugil Girls' Academy (Hangul: 북일여자고등학교; Hanja: 北一女子高等學校) is a private girls' high school located in Cheonan, South Korea. Established in 1995 by Seung-yeon Kim, chairman of the Hanhwa Group, its current principal is Mr. Cho Jae-seung.

References

External links
 

Cheonan
High schools in South Korea
Girls' schools in South Korea
Educational institutions established in 1995
1995 establishments in South Korea